The Kaiser Engineering Building, also called the Raymond Kaiser Engineering Building, is a high-rise located in downtown Oakland, California. It has 25 stories and stands at 336 feet (102 m) tall.

See also
List of tallest buildings in Oakland, California

References

Buildings and structures completed in 1984
Henry J. Kaiser
Skyscraper office buildings in Oakland, California
Skidmore, Owings & Merrill buildings